The Wireless Set No. 62 was a British Army HF band radio transceiver. Introduced by Pye during the later part of World War II as a light-weight and waterproof replacement for the Wireless Set No. 22. Although intended as an interim design, it remained in production until 1966.

Technical specifications 
AM, Superheterodyne radio transceiver.
Frequency coverage: 1.6 - 4.00 MHz, and 4.0 – 10.0 MHz in two switched ranges.
Receiver sensitivity (20 dB signal-to-noise ratio when modulated 30% at 400 cycles): 1.6 - 4.00 MHz, better than 3 μV; 4.0 - 10.00 MHz, better than 6 μV.
Intermediate frequency: 460 KHz 
Receiver Audio output: 200 mW at 1 KHz 
Transmitter RF output: 1 W
Circuitry: 11 valves
Weight: WS62 transceiver unit (excluding accessories) - 13.7 kg
Dimensions: 515 x 260 x 324 mm
Power Supply: 12 V DC at 3.0 to 5.0 Amps from external batteries, powering an internal rotary transformer (motor-generator). Later models used a transistorized inverter power supply.
Antenna Systems: 
Mobile station: vertical rod aerials 4 ft, 8 ft or 14 ft high
Fixed station: vertical ground mounted 32 ft mast
Fixed station: horizontal 100 ft long end-fed wire (adjustable)
 Used Crystal Calibrator No. 10 as an external frequency reference

References

External links 
 http://www.wftw.nl/wireless62.html

British military radio
World War II British electronics